The St. Louis Coliseum was a venue in St. Louis, Missouri. 

The closing of the 1904 World’s Fair left the city without a convention center for three years. A group of businessmen led by attorney Guy Golterman assembled $450,000 in private funding, and built the Coliseum at Washington and Jefferson Avenues. It was designed by Frederick C. Bonsack and occupied a full block. When the cornerstone was laid on August 22, 1908, it was claimed the building would be the largest public building in the United States. It replaced the St. Louis Exposition and Music Hall as the city's main convention and big entertainment center. 

Golterman was the Secretary to the Company and first manager of the Coliseum. Colonel Pickering managed it for some time.

The building accommodated the 1916 Democratic nominating convention, wrestling and boxing matches, trade shows, and musical extravaganzas. Enrico Caruso performed in the Coliseum twice: first with the Metropolitan Opera Company in April 1910 and again in May 1919, giving a concert for Liberty Loans. 

Lack of parking, the emergence of neighborhood swimming pools, and Kiel Auditorium, which opened in 1934, effectively ended the usefulness of St. Louis Coliseum. It was closed in 1939, and it was condemned as unsafe by the city in 1953.

References

Sports venues in St. Louis
Defunct boxing venues in the United States
Defunct indoor arenas in the United States
Sports venues completed in 1908
1908 establishments in Missouri
Defunct sports venues in Missouri
1953 disestablishments in Missouri
Indoor arenas in Missouri
Demolished buildings and structures in St. Louis